Dorstenia uxpanapana is a plant species in the family Moraceae.

It is endemic to Mexico, in an area of eastern Oaxaca and western Veracruz states.

References

uxpanapana
Endemic flora of Mexico
Flora of Oaxaca
Flora of Veracruz
Plants described in 1986